Open News Network e.V. is a German group ("Eingetragener Verein"). It is a network both in the technological and in the social sense. It aims to provide open, non-commercial access to text based usenet. Membership is constituted by support of the project. Support may be in the form of active collaboration, allocation of resources, or both.

History 
21 Feb 2005 Posting in de.comm provider usenet Message-ID: <pan.2005.02.21.01.12.52.335900@familieknaak.de>
8 Mar 2005 Joern Bredereck announced the idea. 
12 May 2007 society according to German law incorporated.

Usenet 
Open-News-Network e.V provides traditional Usenet groups."It is a Germany based cooperative network of Usenet enthusiasts who run their servers on otherwise unused resources."

References

External links 
Official Website

Organisations based in Munich
Usenet free posting